Beloit is an unincorporated community in Dallas County, Alabama.

Geography

References

Orrville , Alabama

Unincorporated communities in Alabama
Unincorporated communities in Dallas County, Alabama